John "Sonny" Allen Field is a baseball venue in Morehead, Kentucky, United States.  It is home to the Morehead State Eagles baseball team of the NCAA Division I Ohio Valley Conference.  It is named for former Morehead State baseball coach John "Sonny" Allen.  Opened in 1973, the venue has a capacity of 1,200 spectators.

Naming 
The venue is named for John "Sonny" Allen, who coached the Morehead State baseball program in 1954–1959, 1966, and 1969–1975, a total of 14 seasons.  Allen's career record was 226–137, and the program won conference championships in 1956, 1969, and 1973 under him.  Allen also played basketball and served as the university's assistant athletic director.

Features 
Allen Field has an irregular layout, with the right field fence standing far closer to home plate than does the left field fence.  As a result, the right field fence has been built much taller than the left field fence in an attempt to balance the irregular dimensions.

The field lies next to Jayne Stadium, the university's football venue.

Renovations 
In 1998, stadium lighting was installed, thanks to a donation from baseball alumnus Willie Blair, who pitched in Major League Baseball.  In 2004, the seating areas, locker rooms, and coaches' offices were improved.  In 2005, the playing surface was renovated.

See also 
 List of NCAA Division I baseball venues

References 

College baseball venues in the United States
Baseball venues in Kentucky
Morehead State Eagles baseball
Buildings and structures in Rowan County, Kentucky
1973 establishments in Kentucky
Sports venues completed in 1973